Hollaback or holla back may refer to:
"Hollaback Girl", a 2005 single by Gwen Stefani
Hollaback!, former name of Right To Be, an online organization formed to combat harassment